National Route A014 is a 4-lane ring-road around the city of San Juan, San Juan Province, Argentina. It goes south from its junction with National Route 40.

The road traverses the San Juan departments of Capital, Rivadavia and Santa Lucía

National roads in San Juan Province, Argentina
Tourism in Argentina